Jazz Contrasts is an album by American jazz trumpeter Kenny Dorham, recorded in 1957 and released on the Riverside label.

Reception

The AllMusic review by Scott Yanow stated: "This album is a bit brief in time (41 minutes) but contains many memorable selections."

Track listing
 "Falling in Love with Love" (Hart, Rodgers) - 9:14  
 "I'll Remember April" (de Paul, Patricia Johnston, Raye) - 12:07  
 "LaRue" (Brown) - 4:31  
 "My Old Flame" (Coslow, Johnston) - 5:25  
 "But Beautiful" (Burke, Van Heusen) - 2:44  
 "La Villa" (Dorham, Gryce) - 7:01

Personnel
Kenny Dorham - trumpet
Sonny Rollins - tenor saxophone (tracks 1, 2, 4, 6)
Hank Jones - piano
Oscar Pettiford - bass 
Max Roach - drums 
Betty Glamann - harp (3-5)

References

Riverside Records albums
Kenny Dorham albums
1957 albums